Caio Henrique da Silva Dantas (born 19 February 1993), known as Caio Dantas, is a Brazilian footballer who plays as a forward for Criciúma, on loan from Água Santa.

Club career
Caio Dantas was top scorer in the 2020 Campeonato Brasileiro Série B whilst playing for Sampaio Corrêa. As a result of standing out in the division, he secured a contract for 2021 in the Chinese Super League with Guangzhou City.

Career statistics

References

External links

1993 births
Living people
Brazilian footballers
Association football forwards
Campeonato Brasileiro Série B players
Campeonato Brasileiro Série C players
Campeonato Brasileiro Série D players
Grêmio Osasco Audax Esporte Clube players
América Futebol Clube (MG) players
Red Bull Brasil players
Uberlândia Esporte Clube players
Esporte Clube Água Santa players
Coimbra Esporte Clube players
Botafogo Futebol Clube (SP) players
Cuiabá Esporte Clube players
Boavista Sport Club players
Sampaio Corrêa Futebol Clube players
Criciúma Esporte Clube players
Sportspeople from Santos, São Paulo